Liquid bandage is a topical skin treatment for minor wounds which binds to the skin to form a protective polymeric layer that keeps dirt and germs out and moisture in.

For the fast-acting, reactive adhesive that is used to mend deep cuts or surgery wounds, see cyanoacrylates (specifically 2-Octyl cyanoacrylate).

Design 

Liquid bandage is typically a polymer dissolved in a solvent (commonly water or an alcohol), sometimes with an added antiseptic and local anesthetic, although the alcohol in some brands may serve the same purpose. These products protect the wound by forming a thin film of polymer when the carrier evaporates. Polymers used may include polyvinylpyrrolidone (water based), ethyl cellulose, pyroxylin/nitrocellulose or poly (methylacrylate-isobutene-monoisopropylmaleate) (alcohol based), and acrylate or siloxane polymers (hexamethyldisiloxane or isooctane solvent based).

In addition to their use in replacing conventional bandages in minor cuts  and scrapes, they have found use in surgical and veterinary offices. Liquid bandages are increasingly finding use in the field of combat, where they can be used to rapidly stanch a wound until proper medical attention can be obtained.

Recent developments 
A novel type of liquid bandage would incorporate amino acids to form peptide links directly with the skin. This product has potential to reduce bleeding during and after surgery.

See also

 Butterfly stitches
 Dermal adhesive

References

Medical dressings
Polymers
Skin care